Kostas Kolomitrousis (born 30 March 1964) is a Greek former professional football player and currently the coach of the youth team of AE Larissa.   
He played as a left back for AE Larissa and Aris in the Greek Super League.

International career
Kolomitrousis appeared in 16 matches for the senior Greece national football team from 1986 to 1988.

References

1964 births
Greek footballers
Greece international footballers
Athlitiki Enosi Larissa F.C. players
Aris Thessaloniki F.C. players
Living people
Association football fullbacks
Footballers from Larissa